"Me Myself & I" is a song by Australian pop rock band 5 Seconds of Summer. It was released on 11 May 2022 as the third single from their fifth studio album 5SOS5.

Background
"Me Myself and I" was written by members of the band, Jon Bellion, Jason Evigan and Pete Nappi. It was produced by Bellion, Evigan and Nappi. Speaking to Rolling Stone Australia about the song, lead singer Luke Hemmings said;

According to Hemmings, the song is about "the emotional cycle of feeling like you can do everything on your own and that you don't need anyone else, but eventually realizing that sometimes you push away the best things in your life." The group performed the song live at Good Morning America.

Reception
The song has been described as a "propulsive break-up anthem". NME called it "an airy, atmospheric soundscape filled with jaunty strummed guitars, ultra-crisp percussion and layered lead vocals primed for singalongs."

Music video
The music video for "Me Myself & I" was released on 13 May 2022 and was directed by Harry Law. The video draws inspiration from "classic pop rock 90's/early 00's music videos such as Oasis, Red Hot Chili Peppers and The All-American Rejects". The video showcases the band performing in a dimly lit warehouse and camera cuts around the different personalities of each band member to reflect stripping back of layers as they confront their reflective consciousness.

Personnel
Credits for "Me Myself & I" adapted from AllMusic.

Musicians

Luke Hemmings – lead vocals, rhythm guitar, composer, keyboards
Michael Clifford – lead guitar, keyboards, backing vocals, composer, vocal producer 
Calum Hood – bass, composer, keyboards, backing vocals
Ashton Irwin – backing vocals, composer, drums, keyboards

Production

Jon Bellion – composer, producer
Bryce Bordone – mixing assistant
Mick Coogan – composer
Lionel Crasta – engineering, vocal producer
Jason Evigan – composer, drum programming, producer, synthesizer
Rafael Fadul – engineering
Chris Gehringer – engineering
Serban Ghenea – engineering
Cameron Hogan – engineering
Chris Kaysch – engineering
Pete Nappi – composer, producer
Matt Pauling – engineering
Jackson Rau – engineering

Charts

Weekly charts

Year-end charts

Release history

References

2022 singles
2022 songs
5 Seconds of Summer songs
Song recordings produced by Jason Evigan
Songs written by Ashton Irwin
Songs written by Calum Hood
Songs written by Jason Evigan
Songs written by Jon Bellion
Songs written by Luke Hemmings
Songs written by Michael Clifford (musician)